Awali Ungunaibe (1947 – 1975) was a Papua New Guinean chief and politician. He served as a member of the House of Assembly between 1972 and 1975.

Biography
Ungunaibe was born in Kun in the Southern Highlands in 1947. Speaking both Tok Pisin and Enga, he worked as an interpreter and domestic servant between 1964 and 1971.

Ungunaibe contested the constituency in the 1972 elections. Although he was in second place after the first count, he won after preferences were distributed and was elected to the House of Assembly. He sat in the House as a member of the United Party.

He died of lung cancer in early 1975 aged 28. Following his death, claims were made that he had been killed by sorcery committed by his political rivals. His brother Tombol won the resulting by-election.

References

1947 births
Members of the House of Assembly of Papua and New Guinea
1975 deaths